Badalucco is an Italian surname. Notable people with the surname include:

Joseph Badalucco Jr., American actor, brother of Michael
Michael Badalucco (born 1954), American actor
Nicola Badalucco (1929–2015), Italian screenwriter

Italian-language surnames